The Douglas Hyde Gallery is a publicly funded contemporary art gallery situated within the historical setting of Trinity College in Dublin, Ireland.

When the Gallery opened in 1978, it was for a number of years Ireland's only public gallery of contemporary art. Today, in an abundance of smaller galleries and exhibition spaces in Dublin, The Douglas Hyde Gallery continues to sustain its reputation for holding exhibitions by some of the most established and well-regarded Irish and international artists working today.

The Douglas Hyde Gallery consists of two exhibition spaces that are used to show concurrent exhibitions, which often have a relating theme or tone.

In 2017 Georgina Jackson was appointed director, taking "over from John Hutchinson who was director for 25 years."

Gallery 1
Gallery 1, designed by Paul Koralek of ABK Architects, is the Gallery's main space and has played host to solo-exhibitions by renowned artists such as Fischli/Weiss, Marlene Dumas, Gabriel Orozco, Mona Hatoum and Peter Doig. Notable Irish artists who have exhibited in Gallery 1 include: Dorothy Cross, Willie Doherty, Gerard Byrne, Patrick Graham, Patrick Hall, Michael Warren, Kathy Prendergast, Aleana Egan, Sam Keogh, Niamh O'Malley, Isabel Nolan, and Sean Lynch.

Gallery 2

Gallery 2, which opened in 2001, was designed by McCullough Mulvin Architects. In addition to exhibitions by contemporary artists, this space was often used by director John Hutchinson to show small collections of ethnographic objects and artefacts, or outsider art, which are generally marginalised by larger museums and galleries. The most popular of these exhibitions have included: Nepalese Shamanic objects, Japanese Tea Bowls and Ghanaian Asafo Fante Flags.

A number of exhibitions in Gallery 2 fall under ‘The Paradise’ series of shows, which invites artists to create a new work or present a series of works based on their own idea of ‘The Paradise’. As of February 2011, there have been 34 exhibitions in The Paradise series.

Publications
The Douglas Hyde Gallery produces publications for many of its exhibitions. These books can take the form of exhibition catalogues, artists’ books or curated projects and, while extremely different in content, they all share a similar exterior presentation. Since 2002, the Gallery has published over forty books in this small, hardback format.

The Leaves & Papers series of books and leaflets is an ongoing project which allows The Douglas Hyde Gallery to produce and publish ideas, images and texts relating to a specific theme or concept which does not always relate directly the Gallery's programme.

Another ongoing series of books documents the Galley's programme while also highlighting some of the central principles of the Gallery and its exhibitions. The books explore ideas about visual culture, identity, and spirituality through carefully selected texts and imagery. These books include: the bread and butter stone, 1997; Patmos, 1999; 33 Happy Moments, 2003; Alabama Chrome, 2007; The Bridge, 2008; Questions of Travel, 2009; Saunter, 2010.

Music
The Douglas Hyde Gallery has become increasingly well known for its programme of musical events. In recent years, Cat Power, Sufjan Stevens and Laura Veirs have all played in the Gallery. Sometimes the musical performances relate directly to exhibitions: In 2008, Jandek performed a concert to coincide with an exhibition of his album covers and in 2009, Jim White played a gig to celebrate the opening of his exhibition of ephemera from the American South. It is more often the case that the performances and exhibitions share a mood or atmosphere rather than a direct connection.

See also
 Temple Bar Gallery and Studios

References

External links
 Official website
 Douglas Hyde Gallery books

1978 establishments in Ireland
Art galleries established in 1978
Art museums and galleries in the Republic of Ireland
Arts in Dublin (city)
Buildings and structures completed in 1978
Buildings and structures of Trinity College Dublin
Contemporary art galleries in Ireland
Trinity College Dublin
Museums in Dublin (city)